Västernorrland County is a county (län) in the north of Sweden. It is bordered by the counties of Gävleborg, Jämtland, Västerbotten and the Gulf of Bothnia.

The name Västernorrland means "Western Norrland", as it was in the western part of the original Norrland (northern Sweden and northern Finland).

Province 
For History, Geography and Culture, see: Ångermanland or Medelpad

Västernorrland County covers approximately the historical provinces of Ångermanland (Angermannia) and Medelpad.

Administration 
The main aim of the county administrative board – a government agency headed by a governor – is to fulfil the goals set out in  national politics by the Riksdag and the government, to coordinate the interests of the county, to promote the development of the county, to establish regional goals and safeguard the due process of law in the handling of each case. See List of Västernorrland governors.

Politics 

Riksdag elections 
The table details all Riksdag election results of Västernorrland County since the unicameral era began in 1970. The blocs denote which party would support the Prime Minister or the lead opposition party towards the end of the elected parliament.

Municipalities 

In Medelpad Province:
Sundsvall
Timrå
Ånge

In Ångermanland Province:
Härnösand
Kramfors
Sollefteå
Örnsköldsvik

Demographics

Foreign background 
SCB have collected statistics on backgrounds of residents since 2002. These tables consist of all who have two foreign-born parents or are born abroad themselves. The chart lists election years and the last year on record alone.

History 
Västernorrland County was formed in 1634, when counties were introduced, replacing the older provinces. Västernorrland then included parts of Sweden north of the city of Gävle, except Jämtland and Härjedalen – which belonged to Norway – and except Finland.

The county grew and shrank significantly since its creation. The boundary adjustments:
 Västerbotten County was separated in 1637. 
 Jämtland and Härjedalen joined in 1657, but they both separated as Jämtland County in 1810. 
 Gävleborg County separated in 1762. 
 Other minor changes have taken place.

 
Even though the name Västernorrland literally means "Western Norrland", it is today situated on the eastern coast of Swedish Norrland. The "west" in its name arose due to the fact that, at the time, Norrland was a much larger region, including northern Finland as well. Västernorrland was therefore in the western "arm" of Norrland in its broadest sense.

Heraldry 
The arms for the County of Västernorrland are a combination of those of Ångermanland and Medelpad. When it is shown with a royal crown, it represents the county administrative board. Blazon: "Parted per pale, the arms of Angermannia and the arms of Medelpad."

Miscellaneous topics 
Local public transport in the county is provided by Din Tur.

See also 
 Rutberget, a 342m high mountain
 Västernorrland County Museum

References and notes

External links 

Västernorrland County Administrative Board
Västernorrland County Council
Regional Association of Local Authorities in Västernorrland

 

 
Counties of Sweden
Ångermanland
Medelpad